Gibsonville is an unincorporated community in Sierra County, California, United States. A post office opened in Gibsonville in 1855 and closed in 1910.

References

Unincorporated communities in California
Unincorporated communities in Sierra County, California